Neunkhausen is an Ortsgemeinde – a community belonging to a Verbandsgemeinde – in the Westerwaldkreis in Rhineland-Palatinate, Germany.

Geography

The community lies in the Westerwald between Limburg and Siegen on the boundary with North Rhine-Westphalia. Neunkhausen belongs to the Verbandsgemeinde of Bad Marienberg, a kind of collective municipality. Its seat is in the like-named town.

History
In 1215, Adelheit von Molsberg endowed the parish of Kirburg to found a monastery. On the spot, which is still called Zum Altenkloster (“At the Old Monastery”), a chapel brings the past to mind. It nowadays belongs to the Ortsgemeinde of Neunkhausen. For the monks living there then, the rough climate on the Neunkhäuser Plateau, as it was known, was too harsh. They moved to a spot on the river Nister where they built the Marienstatt Monastery.

In 1259, Neunkhausen had its first documentary mention. All statistics and information about Neunkhausen in the Middle Ages stem from the Marienstatt Monastery's documents.

Politics

Municipal council
The municipal council is made up of 16 council members who were elected in a majority vote in a municipal election on 13 June 2004.

Coat of arms
The community's arms show not only its membership in the parish of Kirburg but also the lion of the County of Sayn. The chapel in the lower field symbolizes the old monastery as well as the St.Wendelinuskapelle. This chapel had its first documentary mention in 1447. It was found on what is today Neunkhausen's fountain square and was endowed by the Counts of Sayn. It stood until 1822.

Economy and infrastructure

South of the community runs Bundesstraße 414, leading from Driedorf-Hohenroth to Hachenburg. The nearest Autobahn interchange is Haiger/Burbach on the A 45 (Dortmund–Hanau), some 25 km away. The nearest InterCityExpress stop is the railway station at Montabaur on the Cologne-Frankfurt high-speed rail line.

References

External links
 Neunkhausen 

Municipalities in Rhineland-Palatinate
Westerwaldkreis